Joseph Rabatta (born 1624 in Gorizia) was an Italian clergyman and bishop for the Roman Catholic Archdiocese of Ljubljana. He was ordained in 1664. He was appointed bishop in 1664. He died in 1683.

References 

1624 births
1683 deaths
17th-century Italian Roman Catholic bishops